Sasa palmata is a species of low-growing, shade-tolerant bamboo that is native to Japan. It is known as broadleaf bamboo or broad-leaved bamboo.

References

Bambusoideae
Endemic flora of Japan
Grasses of Asia